This article concerns the men's team; for information on the Irish women's team, see Ireland women's international rules football team.
This article concerns the hybrid sport of International Rules Football; for information on Ireland's national Australian Rules Football team, see Ireland national Australian rules football team.

The Ireland international rules football team is the representative team for Ireland in international rules football, a compromise between Gaelic football and Australian rules football. The team is made up of Irish players from the Gaelic Athletic Association and Australian Football League.

Prior to 2006, an under-19 and under-17 team had participated in a similar series, while a women's team participated in 2006. Currently, the Ireland team plays at least one of its home games at Croke Park, with recent alternative venues being Pearse Stadium in Galway in 2006, the Gaelic Grounds in Limerick in 2010 and Breffni Park in Cavan in 2013.

At present the only team Ireland plays is the Australia international rules football team, on an annual basis in the International Rules Series. As of 2015, Ireland have won ten of 19 series, won 21 of 40 test matches played and participated in two draws, all since the inaugural 1984 Series.

Squads

2017 squad (Tour to Australia)
Aidan O'Shea (Mayo) – Captain
Conor McManus (Monaghan) – Vice Captain
Niall Morgan (Tyrone) – Goalkeeper
Chris Barrett (Mayo)
Gary Brennan (Clare)
Eoin Cadogan (Cork)
Killian Clarke (Cavan)
Peter Crowley (Kerry)
Kevin Feely (Kildare)
Paul Geaney (Kerry)
Niall Grimley (Armagh) 
Pearce Hanley ( & Mayo)
Brendan Harrison (Mayo)
Darren Hughes (Monaghan)
Michael Murphy (Donegal)
Niall Murphy (Sligo)
Paul Murphy (Kerry)
Karl O'Connell (Monaghan)
Seán Powter (Cork)
Ciarán Sheehan (Cork)
Niall Sludden (Tyrone)
Enda Smith (Roscommon)
Conor Sweeney (Tipperary)
Zach Tuohy ( & Laois)
Shane Walsh (Galway)
Manager: Joe Kernan

2015 squad
Bernard Brogan (Dublin) – Captain
Lee Keegan (Mayo) – Vice Captain
Niall Morgan (Tyrone) – Goalkeeper
Colm Begley (Laois)
Gary Brennan (Clare)
Eoin Cadogan (Cork)
Mattie Donnelly (Tyrone)
Eoin Doyle (Kildare)
Peter Harte (Tyrone)
Darren Hughes (Monaghan)
Paul Kerrigan (Cork)
Jack McCaffrey (Dublin)
Ciarán McDonald (Tipperary)
Philly McMahon (Dublin)
Conor McManus (Monaghan)
Rory O'Carroll (Dublin)
John O'Loughlin (Laois)
Aidan O'Shea (Mayo)
Michael Quinn (Longford)
Colm Cooper (Kerry)
Diarmuid Connolly (Dublin)
Paul Cribbin (Kildare)
Paddy McBrearty (Donegal)

Manager: Joe Kernan

2014 squad (Tour to Australia)
Michael Murphy (Donegal) – Captain
Aidan Walsh (Cork) – Vice Captain
Paddy O'Rourke (Meath) – Goalkeeper
Cathal Cregg (Roscommon)
Mattie Donnelly (Tyrone)
Finian Hanley (Galway)
Pearce Hanley ( & Mayo)
Darren Hughes (Monaghan)
Lee Keegan (Mayo)
James McCarthy (Dublin)
Ciarán McDonald (Tipperary)
Neil McGee (Donegal)
Chrissy McKaigue (Derry)
Kevin McKernan (Down)
Kevin McLoughlin (Mayo)
Conor McManus (Monaghan)
David Moran (Kerry)
Niall Morgan (Tyrone)
Ross Munnelly (Laois)
Colm Begley (Laois)
Colm O'Neill (Cork)
Padraig O'Neill (Kildare)
Seán Cavanagh (Tyrone)
Colm Boyle (Mayo)
Aidan O'Shea (Mayo)
Manager: Paul Earley

2013 squad
Michael Murphy (Donegal) – Captain
Aidan Walsh (Cork) – Vice Captain
Paddy O'Rourke (Meath) – Goalkeeper
Colm Begley (Laois)
Colm Boyle (Mayo)
Ciarán Byrne (Louth)
Seán Cavanagh (Tyrone)
Paul Conroy (Galway)
Paul Flynn (Dublin)
Finian Hanley (Galway)
Lee Keegan (Mayo)
Ciarán Kilkenny (Dublin)
Paddy McBrearty (Donegal)
Jack McCaffrey (Dublin)
Neil McGee (Donegal)
Chrissy McKaigue (Derry)
Kevin McLoughlin (Mayo)
Conor McManus (Monaghan)
Ross Munnelly (Laois)
Aidan O'Shea (Mayo)
Ciarán Sheehan (Cork)
Michael Shields (Cork)
Zach Tuohy (Carlton & Laois)
Manager: Paul Earley

Changes ahead of second Test
Ciarán McKeever (Armagh) for  Finian Hanley
Johnny Doyle (Kildare) for Aidan O'Shea

2011 squad (Tour to Australia)
Stephen Cluxton (Dublin - captain/goalkeeper)
Ciarán McKeever (Armagh - vice captain)
Pearce Hanley (Brisbane Lions & Mayo)
Eoin Cadogan (Cork)
Kieran Donaghy (Kerry)
Leighton Glynn (Wicklow)
Finian Hanley (Galway)
Emmet Bolton (Kildare)
Darren Hughes (Monaghan)
Tadhg Kennelly (Sydney Swans & Kerry - Irish player of the series)
Steven McDonnell (Armagh)
Kevin McKernan (Down)
Joe McMahon (Tyrone)
Neil McGee (Donegal)
Michael Murphy (Donegal)
Karl Lacey (Donegal)
Kevin Reilly (Meath)
Aidan Walsh (Cork)
Zach Tuohy (Carlton & Laois)
Colm Begley (Laois)
Brendan Murphy (Carlow)
Eamonn Callaghan (Kildare)
Tommy Walsh (Sydney Swans & Kerry)
Patrick Kelly (Cork)
Manager: Anthony Tohill

*Ireland won series 130-65 on aggregate

2010 squad

Steven McDonnell (Armagh - captain)
Finian Hanley (Galway - vice captain)
Colm Begley (Laois - Irish player of the series)
Bernard Brogan (Dublin)
Graham Canty (Cork)
Seán Cavanagh (Tyrone)
Martin Clarke (Down)
Stephen Cluxton (Dublin - goalkeeper)
Brendan Donaghy (Armagh)
Leighton Glynn (Wicklow)
Daniel Goulding (Cork)
James Kavanagh (Kildare)
Paddy Keenan (Louth)
Tadhg Kennelly (Sydney Swans & Kerry)
Sean McDermott (Roscommon)
Ciarán McKeever (Armagh)
Kevin McKernan (Down)
Brendan Murphy (Carlow)
Michael Murphy (Donegal)
Kevin Reilly (Meath)
Michael Shields (Cork)
Tommy Walsh (St Kilda & Kerry)
Benny Coulter (Down)
Niall McNamee (Offaly)
Emmet Bolton (Kildare)
Manager: Anthony Tohill

*Ireland lost series 102-92 on aggregate

2008 squad (Tour to Australia)
Source
David Gallagher (Meath) goalkeeper
Aidan O'Mahony (Kerry)
Finian Hanley (Galway)
John Keane (Westmeath)
Bryan Cullen (Dublin)
Kevin Reilly (Meath)
Ciaran McKeever (Armagh)
Graham Canty (Cork - Irish player of the series)
Colm Begley (Brisbane Lions & Laois)
Enda McGinley (Tyrone)
Seán Cavanagh (Tyrone) - Captain
Joe McMahon (Tyrone)
Steven McDonnell (Armagh)
Kieran Donaghy (Kerry)
Killian Young (Kerry)
Benny Coulter (Down)
Paddy Bradley (Derry)
Leighton Glynn (Wicklow)
Aaron Kernan (Armagh)
Ciarán Lyng (Wexford)
Justin McMahon (Tyrone)
Michael Meehan (Galway)
John Miskella (Cork)
Pearse O'Neill (Cork)
Tom Parsons (Mayo)
Paul Finlay (Monaghan)
Manager: Sean Boylan

*Ireland won series 102-97 on aggregate

2006 squad
Kieran McGeeney (Captain) (Armagh)
Tadhg Kennelly (Sydney & Kerry)
Aidan O'Mahony (Kerry)
Marc Ó Sé (Kerry)
Kieran Donaghy (Kerry)
Paul Galvin (Kerry)
Kevin Reilly (Meath)
Anthony Moyles (Meath)
Graham Geraghty (Meath)
Alan Quirke (Cork)
Nicholas Murphy (Cork)
Rónán Clarke (Armagh)
Steven McDonnell (Armagh) 
Tom Kelly (Laois)
Colm Begley (Brisbane & Laois)
Seán Marty Lockhart (Derry) 
Shane Ryan (Dublin)
Alan Brogan (Dublin)
Kieran Fitzgerald (Galway)
Joe Bergin (Galway)
Seán Cavanagh (Tyrone)
Brendan Coulter (Down) 
Dermot Earley (Kildare)
Paul Barden (Longford) 
Karl Lacey (Donegal)
Manager: Seán Boylan

*Ireland lost series 109-79 on aggregate

2005 squad (Tour to Australia)
Michael McVeigh (Down)
Eoin Brosnan (Kerry)
Graham Canty (Cork)
Seán Cavanagh (Tyrone)
Rónán Clarke (Armagh)
Colm Cooper (Kerry)
Brendan Coulter (Down)
Bryan Cullen (Dublin)
Dessie Dolan (Westmeath)
Brian Dooher (Tyrone)
Mattie Forde (Wexford)
David Heaney (Mayo)
Phillip Jordan (Tyrone)
Pádraic Joyce (Galway, captain)
Tom Kelly (Laois)
Seán Marty Lockhart (Derry)
Anthony Lynch (Cork)
Ciarán McDonald (Mayo)
Brian McGuigan (Tyrone)
Ciaran McManus (Offaly)
Ryan McMenamin (Tyrone)
Michael Meehan (Galway)
Owen Mulligan (Tyrone)
Ross Munnelly (Laois)
Seán Óg Ó hAilpín (Cork)
Stephen O'Neill (Tyrone)
Tomás Ó Sé (Kerry)

2004 squad
Stephen Cluxton (Dublin)
Seán Marty Lockhart (Derry)
Graham Canty (Cork)
Seán Óg Ó hAilpín (Cork)
Ciaran McManus (Offaly)
Tom Kelly (Laois)
Joe Bergin (Laois)
Ciarán McDonald (Mayo)
Seán Cavanagh (Tyrone)
Pádraic Joyce (Galway)
Brendan Coulter (Down)
Tadhg Kennelly (Kerry)
Paul Galvin (Kerry)
Steven McDonnell (Armagh)
Dessie Dolan (Westmeath)
Setanta Ó hAilpín (Cork)
Alan Brogan (Dublin)
Mattie Forde (Wexford)
Brian McGuigan (Tyrone)
David Heaney (Mayo)
James Nallen (Mayo)
Bryan Cullen (Dublin)

2003 squad (Tour to Australia)
Enda Murphy (Kildare)
Paddy Christie (Dublin)
Anthony Lynch (Cork)
Cormac McAnallen (Tyrone)
Seán Marty Lockhart (Derry)
Kieran McGeeney (Armagh)
Graham Canty (Cork)
Paul McGrane (Armagh)
Ciaran McManus (Offaly)
Joe Bergin (Galway)
Brendan Coulter (Down)
Pádraic Joyce (Galway)
Steven McDonnell (Armagh)
Dessie Dolan (Westmeath)
Joe Higgins (Laois)
Tom Kelly (Laois)
Kevin Hughes (Tyrone)
Shane Ryan (Dublin)
Brian McDonald (Laois)
Odhran O'Dwyer (Clare)
 Stephen Kelly (Limerick)

2002 squad
Peter Burke (Mayo)
Joe Bergin (Galway)
Graham Canty (Cork)
Ray Cosgrove (Dublin)
Dessie Dolan (Westmeath) 
Graham Geraghty (Meath)
Trevor Giles (Meath)
Pádraic Joyce (Galway)
Evan Kelly (Meath)
Tadhg Kennelly (Kerry)
Anthony Lynch (Cork)
Cormac McAnallen (Tyrone)
Kieran McGeeney (Armagh)
Paul McGrane (Armagh)
Ciaran McManus (Offaly)
Declan Meehan (Galway)
Seamus Moynihan (Kerry)
Eamonn O'Hara (Sligo)
Darragh Ó Sé (Kerry)
Tomás Ó Sé (Kerry)
Brendan Jer O'Sullivan (Cork)
Anthony Rainbow (Kildare)
Derek Savage (Galway)
Paul Barden (Longford)

2001 squad (Tour to Australia)
Cormac O'Sullivan (Meath)
Graham Canty (Cork)
Coman Goggins (Dublin)
Darren Fay (Meath)
Ciarán Whelan (Dublin)
Seán Marty Lockhart (Derry)
Eamonn O'Hara (Sligo) 
Ciaran McManus (Offaly)
Kieran McGeeney (Armagh)
Francie Grehan (Roscommon)
Seán Óg De Paor (Galway)
Anthony Rainbow (Kildare)
Seamus Moynihan (Kerry)
Anthony Tohill (Derry)
Cormac McAnallen (Tyrone)
Darragh Ó Sé (Kerry)
Graham Geraghty (Meath)
Pádraic Joyce (Galway)
Niall Buckley (Kildare)
Tadhg Kennelly (Kerry)
Michael Donnellan (Galway)
Brendan Jer O'Sullivan (Cork)
Mike Frank Russell (Kerry)
Dermot Earley (Kildare)
Dermot McCabe (Cavan)
Johnny Crowley (Kerry)
Brendan Devenney (Donegal)

2000 squad
Cormac O'Sullivan (Meath)
Declan O'Keeffe (Kerry)
Darren Fay (Meath) 
Seamus Moynihan (Kerry) 
Seán Marty Lockhart (Derry) 
Mark Crossan (Donegal)
Seamus Quinn (Leitrim) 
Finbar Cullen (Offaly)
Anthony Rainbow (Kildare) 
Seán Óg de Paor (Galway) 
Eoin Sexton (Cork)
Kieran McGeeney (Armagh)
Glenn Ryan (Kildare)
Anthony Tohill (Derry) 
Darragh Ó Se (Kerry) 
Brian Stynes (Dublin) 
Trevor Giles (Meath)
Dermot Earley (Kildare) 
Colm McMenamon (Mayo)
Michael Donnellan (Galway) 
Ciaran McManus(Offaly) 
Gerard Cavlan (Tyrone) 
Colin Moran (Dublin) 
Larry Reilly (Cavan) 
Eoin Gormley (Tyrone)
Pádraic Joyce (Galway) 
Graham Geraghty (Meath)
*Ireland lost series 123-98 on aggregate

1999 squad (Tour to Australia)

Declan O'Keeffe – Goalkeeper (Kerry)
Seán Óg De Paor (Galway)
Darren Fay (Meath)
Finbarr Cullen (Offaly)
Glenn Ryan (Kildare)
Seán Marty Lockhart (Derry)
James Nallen (Mayo)
John McDermott  – Captain (Meath)
Ciarán Whelan (Dublin)
Ciarán O'Sullivan (Cork)
Trevor Giles (Meath)
Brian Stynes (Dublin)
Peter Canavan (Tyrone)
Joe Kavanagh (Cork)
Jarlath Fallon (Galway)
Anthony Tohill (Derry)
Michael Donnellan (Galway)
Seamus Moynihan (Kerry)
Dermot Earley (Kildare)
Niall Buckley (Kildare)
John Quane (Limerick)
James Horan (Mayo)
Graham Geraghty (Meath)
Ciaran McManus (Offaly)
Derry Foley (Tipperary)
Dessie Dolan (Westmeath)

1998 squad
Finbarr McConnell (Tyrone - goalkeeper)
Peter Canavan (Tyrone)
Kieran McGeeney (Armagh)
Diarmaid Marsden (Armagh)
Anthony Tohill (Derry)
Seán Marty Lockhart (Derry)
Brendan Devenney (Donegal)
Paul Brewster (Fermanagh)
Dermot McCabe (Cavan)
Darren Fay (Meath)
James Nallen (Mayo)
Colm Parkinson (Laois)
Derry Foley (Tipperary)
Finbar Cullen (Offaly)
John Kenny (Offaly)
Brian Stynes (Dublin)
Séamus Moynihan (Kerry)
John McDermott (Meath) - Captain
Jarlath Fallon (Galway)
Michael Donnellan (Galway)
Niall Buckley (Kildare)
Seán Óg de Paor (Galway)
Colm McManaman (Mayo)
Glenn Ryan (Kildare)
*Ireland won series 128-118 on aggregate

Roll of honour

List of captains and managers
Since 1998

List of appearances by county
Since 1998
 The following lists the number of occasions counties have been represented in the Ireland national team (updated to end of 2014 series).

† This figure does not indicate the number of test matches these players have played. Rather it indicates the number of times they have been selected in an Ireland squad.

Kit suppliers and shirt sponsors

See also
 Ireland women's international rules football team

References

 
International rules football teams